The Southwest International League was a minor league baseball league that operated from 1951 through 1952.  The league was formed through the merger of the Sunset League and Arizona–Texas League in 1951. The league hosted franchises based in Mexico, Arizona, California, Nevada and Texas.

History
Formed in 1951 by a merger of the Sunset League and Arizona-Texas League, the Southwest International League played two seasons as a Class C level league. In 1951, the Tijuana players went on strike over not being paid on a regular basis. In 1952, the league fielded an all-black team, which was originally supposed to play half of its games in the US and half in Mexico, but eventually settled in Porterville, California as the Porterville Comets. Only 4 of the 6 entries survived the complete 1952 season, before the league permanently folded.

Cities represented 
Bisbee, AZ and Douglas, AZ: Bisbee-Douglas Copper Kings 1951
Ciudad Juarez, MEX: Juarez Indios 1951
El Centro, CA: El Centro Imperials 1951
El Paso, TX: El Paso Texans 1951
Las Vegas, NV: Las Vegas Wranglers 1951–1952
Mexicali, MEX: Mexicali Eagles 1951–1952
Phoenix, AZ: Phoenix Senators 1951
Porterville, CA: Porterville Comets 1952 
Tijuana, MEX: Tijuana Potros 1951–1952
Tucson, AZ: Tucson Cowboys 1951
Yuma, AZ: Yuma Panthers 1951–1952

Standings & statistics
1951 Southwest International Leagueschedule President: Les Powers
Playoff: Mexicali 4 games, Phoenix 1.

 
1952 Southwest International League President: Harry Ledell 
 Porterville Franchise started the season as Riverside–Ensenda, became Riverside–Porterville, moved to Porterville April 25, then disbanded August 1.; El Centro disbanded July 13.

References 
 McCann, M. (n.d.). Minor League Baseball History. Retrieved April 27, 2007, from https://www.webcitation.org/query?url=http://www.geocities.com/big_bunko/total.htm&date=2009-10-25+13:34:30

Sports leagues established in 1951
1951 establishments in the United States
Defunct minor baseball leagues in the United States
Baseball leagues in Nevada
Baseball leagues in Arizona
Baseball leagues in Texas
Baseball leagues in California
Defunct baseball leagues in Mexico
Sports leagues disestablished in 1952